Bigelow Township is an inactive township in Holt County, in the U.S. state of Missouri.

Bigelow Township was established in 1869, taking its name from Bigelow, Missouri.

References

Townships in Missouri
Townships in Holt County, Missouri